Nash Field is a former American football stadium located in Kenosha, Wisconsin.  The stadium was home to the Kenosha Maroons of the National Football League in 1924.  It had a capacity of 5,000 spectators.  The stadium was built on the grounds of Nash Motors.

External links 
Stadium information
More stadium information

Kenosha Maroons
American football venues in Wisconsin
Defunct National Football League venues
Nash Motors
Defunct sports venues in Wisconsin